The 2017 NCAA Division I women's basketball tournament was played from Friday, March 17 to Sunday, April 2, 2017, with the Final Four played at the American Airlines Center in Dallas, Texas  on March 31 and April 2.  This was the first time that the women's Final Four was played in Dallas and the first time since 2002 that the Final Four games were played on Friday and Sunday, rather than Sunday and Tuesday. South Carolina defeated Mississippi State to win the championship.

Tennessee continued its record streak of making every NCAA women's basketball tournament at 36 consecutive appearances. UConn also continued its record streak of 10 consecutive Final Four appearances.

2017 NCAA Tournament schedule and venues
The first two rounds, also referred to as the subregionals, were played at the sites of the top 16 seeds, as was done in 2016. The following are the sites that hosted each round of the 2017 tournament.

First and Second Rounds
March 17 and 19
 Colonial Life Arena, Columbia, South Carolina (Host: University of South Carolina)
 Donald L. Tucker Civic Center, Tallahassee, Florida (Host: Florida State University)
 Edmund P. Joyce Center, Notre Dame, Indiana (Host: University of Notre Dame)
 Frank Erwin Center, Austin, Texas (Host: University of Texas at Austin)
 Gill Coliseum, Corvallis, Oregon (Host: Oregon State University)
 Humphrey Coliseum, Mississippi State, Mississippi (Host: Mississippi State University)
 Memorial Coliseum, Lexington, Kentucky (Host: University of Kentucky)
 Xfinity Center, College Park, Maryland (Host: University of Maryland)
March 18 and 20
 Bramlage Coliseum, Manhattan, Kansas (Host: Kansas State University)
 Cameron Indoor Stadium, Durham, North Carolina (Host: Duke University)
 Ferrell Center, Waco, Texas (Host: Baylor University)
 Harry A. Gampel Pavilion, Storrs, Connecticut (Host: University of Connecticut)
 Hec Edmundson Pavilion, Seattle, Washington (Host: University of Washington) 
 KFC Yum! Center, Louisville, Kentucky (Host: University of Louisville)
 Pauley Pavilion, Los Angeles, California (Host: University of California, Los Angeles) 
 Watsco Center, Coral Gables, Florida (Host: University of Miami)

Regional semifinals and finals (Sweet Sixteen and Elite Eight)

March 24–27
 Bridgeport Regional, Webster Bank Arena, Bridgeport, Connecticut (Hosts: Fairfield University and University of Connecticut)
 Oklahoma City Regional, Chesapeake Energy Arena, Oklahoma City, Oklahoma (Host: University of Oklahoma)
 Lexington Regional, Rupp Arena, Lexington, Kentucky (Host: University of Kentucky)
 Stockton Regional, Stockton Arena, Stockton, California (Host: University of the Pacific)

National semifinals and championship (Final Four and championship)
March 31 and April 2
American Airlines Center, Dallas, Texas (Host: Big 12 Conference)

Tournament procedure

	
Pending any changes to the format, a total of 64 teams will enter the 2017 tournament. 32 automatic bids shall be awarded to each program that wins their conference's tournament. The remaining 36 bids are "at-large", with selections extended by the NCAA Selection Committee. The tournament is split into four regional tournaments, and each regional has teams seeded from 1 to 16, with the committee ostensibly making every region as comparable to the others as possible. The top-seeded team in each region plays the #16 team, the #2 team plays the #15, etc. (meaning where the two seeds add up to 17, that team will be assigned to play another).

The basis for the subregionals returned to the approach used between 1982 and 2002; the top sixteen teams, as chosen in the bracket selection process, hosted the first two rounds on campus.

The Selection Committee will also seed the entire field from 1 to 64.

Selections for the 2017 NCAA Division I Women's Basketball Championship were announced at 7 p.m. Eastern time, Monday, March 13 via ESPN.

Subregionals tournament and automatic qualifiers

Automatic qualifiers
The following teams automatically qualified for the 2017 NCAA field by virtue of winning their conference's tournament.

Tournament seeds

Tournament records 

 Kentucky's Evelyn Akhator recorded 23 rebounds in a second-round game against Ohio State, tied for second most ever  in an NCAA tournament game
 Duke held Hampton to 2 points in the second period of a first-round game, the fewest points scored in a period in an NCAA tournament game
 Baylor beat Texas Southern by 89 points in a first-round game, the largest margin of victory in an NCAA tournament game
 Texas A&M was behind by 21 points to Penn (58–37) in the fourth period of a first-round game, but came back to win 63–61
 Washington made 18 three-pointers in a second-round game against Oklahoma, the most ever made in an NCAA tournament game
 UConn's Kia Nurse made 22 three-pointers in the tournament, the most ever made in an NCAA tournament
 Nurse made 9 threes in the 2nd round against Syracuse, the most ever made in an NCAA tournament game

Games

Bridgeport Regional, Bridgeport, CT

First round
 UConn took on the America East champion, in a first-round game between the top-seeded Huskies and the 16 seed Albany. The Huskies scored the first nine points, but the Great Danes cut the lead to three points 10–7 early in the first quarter. Despite leading 58–32 at halftime, the halftime discussion among the players was how to boost their intensity on defense. The Huskies held Albany to 23 points in the second half and went on to win the game 116–55.
 Iowa State chose to concentrate their defensive efforts on Syracuse's top two scoring threats, Britney Sykes and Alexis Peterson, but Gabby Cooper made them pay by hitting five three-pointers in the first seven minutes of the game. By the end of the first quarter, Syracuse had a 25-point lead. Although Iowa State  outscored Syracuse the remainder of the game, the damage had been done and the eighth-seeded Syracuse team defeated the ninth seeded Iowa State team 85–65. Cooper scored early for Syracuse but Sykes ended up with 28 points and Peterson with 25.
 Despite being the 12 seed, Penn dominated the fifth-seeded Texas A&M for the first three quarters of the game. The Quakers had a 21-point lead in the fourth quarter when the Aggies switched to a full-court press which turned out to be effective as it forced seven turnovers in the quarter. This, combined with their inability to shoot, missing their last 10 shots, created the greatest comeback in NCAA tournament history. The previous record was 16 points, but this game set a new record at 21 points. Texas A&M ended up with the 63–61 win over Penn.
 UCLA took on Boise State in a match-up between the 4 seed and the 13 seed. The Bruins scored 15 points before the Broncos had their first point. UCLA hit 58% of their shots and a slightly higher percentage, 59%, from beyond the arc. Billings had 19 points for the Bruins while Jordin Canada tied a school record with 16 assists, to go along with her 15 points. UCLA ended up with the win 83–56.
 Sixth-seeded West Virginia took on 11 seeded Elon, playing in their first ever NCAA tournament. Despite having beaten Baylor in the Big 12 Conference tournament, the Mountaineers remained in a close game with the Phoenix for much of the game. The score was tied at 53 points apiece when the mountaineers ran off 10 straight points to open up a 10-point margin. Tynice Martin scored 26 points for West Virginia and Katrina Pardee hit two crucial three-pointers to help West Virginia to the 75–62 win. Elon is coached by Charlotte Smith who hit one of the most memorable shots in NCAA tournament history when she had a three-pointer in the final second of the 1994 championship game to seal the win for North Carolina.
 Oregon had not been in the tournament for 12 years but made the most of it. Seeded 10th, they took on the seventh-seeded Temple Owls in a first-round game which came down to the final seconds. The Duck's Ruthy Hebard sank a basket with 5 1/2 seconds to go in the game that proved to be the winning basket. The Owls attempted a final shot but the freshman Hebard blocked it as time expired to give the Ducks a 71–70 victory.
 Hampton faced Duke in a first-round matchup between two teams that did not make the tournament last year. The Pirates had a "horrendous" second quarter scoring only two points against the Blue Devils 31. Rebecca Greenwell had a double double with 26 points and 10 rebounds for Duke who went on to win easily 94–31. Duke's Kyra Lambert left the game with an knee injury in the second quarter and did not return.

Bracket 

Highlights
 The Texas A&M–Penn game saw the biggest comeback in the history of the women's tournament, as Texas A&M erased a 21-point deficit in the fourth quarter. The previous record was 16 points by Notre Dame in 2001 and Michigan State in 2005.

Bridgeport Regional Final

Bridgeport Regional All-Tournament team
 Napheesa Collier, Connecticut (MOP)
 Gabby Williams, Connecticut 
 Saniya Chong, Connecticut
 Sabrina Ionescu, Oregon
 Jordin Canada, UCLA

Oklahoma City Regional, Oklahoma City, OK

First round 
 UConn had tied the tournament record for points in a game early in the day with 116 points, but Baylor set a new record, scoring 119 points against Texas Southern, appearing in their first ever tournament. The Bears scored the first 22 points of the game before Texas Southern could score. In addition to setting a record for the highest score in an NCAA tournament game, Baylor shattered the margin of victory record, previously 74 points, by holding Texas Southern to 30 points, thus setting a new margin of victory record at 89 points.
 California opened up an early lead against LSU, extending the lead to as many as 10 points. LSU played from behind much of the game but closed the lead — the teams were tied at 50 points each with just under a minute and a half left in the game. Cal's Asha Thomas hit a three to give the Bears the lead. LSU had several chances to respond, but down by one point with 10 seconds left, LSU's Alexis Hyder drove from the left side attempting to make a game winning layup but Kristine Anigwe was there and blocked the ball. There was a scramble for the ball which resulted in two foul shots for Anigwe who hit them both to give California a 55–52 win.
 Fifth-seeded Tennessee led 12th seeded Dayton at the end of the first quarter 20–9, but Dayton responded with a 20–9 run of their own to tie the game up to 29 points apiece at halftime. Tennessee took over again in the third quarter, but this time the Flyers were unable to respond in Tennessee finished with the win 66–57.
 13th seeded Chattanooga kept the game close against fourth seeded Louisville for much of the game, but the Cardinals went on a 20–6 run in the final quarter, led by Asia Durr, to open up a large lead the Mocs could never overcome. The Cardinals won 82–62.
 Oklahoma faced Gonzaga, a matchup between the 6 and 11 seeds. The Sooners started off strong and held a 13-point lead at the end of the first quarter 2 –16. That margin would match the final margin of victory, although the Bulldogs cut the lead to five points twice in the fourth quarter. Vionise Pierre-Louis was close to a triple-double for Oklahoma with 17 points nine rebounds and nine block shots. The final score was 75–62.
 Washington, the third seed, took on Montana State the 14 seed. Although Washington led early, they couldn't create much separation between themselves and the Bobcats. Although Montana State's Peyton Ferris was only 5'9", she was asked to play in the post. Despite the size advantage of Washington she was effective and ended the game with 33 points. She fouled out with just under three minutes left in the game as fans of both teams gave her a standing ovation for her performance. Although Montana State kept the game reasonably close for the first 27 minutes, the Huskies eventually built a large lead and ended up with the 91–63 win.
 DePaul played Northern Iowa in a match-up between the seven and 10 seeds. The Panthers scored first, but DePaul responded with a pair of 7–0 runs to take a nine-point lead. DePaul brought Tanita Allen off the bench who hit her first five three-pointers en route to a 25-point game to help the Blue Demons win the game 88–67.
 Mississippi State took on Troy in a 2 seed versus 15 seed match-up. The Bulldogs head coach Vic Schaefer dramatically changed his lineup after the loss in the SEC championship, having three starters come in off the bench, including Victoria Vivians for the first time in her career. Blair Schaefer, the coach's daughter, recorded a career-high 21 points, helping her team to a 110–69 victory.

Bracket 

* – Denotes overtime period

Oklahoma City Regional Final

Oklahoma City Regional All-Tournament team
 Morgan William, Mississippi State (MOP)
 Victoria Vivians, Mississippi State
 Teaira McCowan, Mississippi State
 Nina Davis, Baylor
 Kalani Brown, Baylor

Lexington Regional, Lexington, KY

First round 
 Robert Morris fell behind 10–0 early in the game against the top seed Notre Dame, but managed to tie the game up at 10 points apiece. However, Notre Dame had too much talent and retook the lead extending at especially in the third quarter when they shot 69% and held Robert Morris to 29%. The final margin of 30 points in the 79–49 result was the smallest margin of loss in any of the five tournament games for the Colonials.
 The ninth-seeded Purdue Boilermakers started strong against the eighth-seeded Green Bay with an early 15–0 run to open up a 17–3 lead. Although the Phoenix cut into the lead in the second quarter and second half, the boilermakers responded each time. Green Bay was within five points with  minutes left, but Dominique Oden hit a three-pointer, and Purdue hit many of their closing free throws to end up with the win 74–62.
 Ohio State took on Western Kentucky in a 5–12 match-up. Each team started slowly missing most of its early shots with Western Kentucky building a small lead early and still leading 18–14 late in the first quarter. The Buckeyes then ran off seven consecutive points to take a lead. Although the Lady Toppers briefly led in the second quarter, the Buckeyes had a seven-point lead at halftime. Ohio State led the rest of the way although WKU would cut the lead to six points twice. The Buckeyes ended with the win 70–63.
 Fourth-seeded Kentucky took on 13th-seeded Belmont, who came into the tournament with a 21-game winning streak, the second-longest in the nation. The Kentucky Wildcats hit 69% of their shots in the first quarter to help them open up a 10-point lead. Belmont responded by hitting seven of 9 to cut the lead to a single point. Kentucky expanded and retained the lead through most of the game, but Belmont cut the lead to a single point with just 13 seconds left in the game. Kentucky hit two free throws to extend the lead to three points, followed by a Belmont layup to get the lead back to a single point, but Kentucky hit two free throws to seal the win 73–70.
 Texas took on the Central Arkansas Sugar Bears in a match-up between the 3 and 14 seeds. Texas had lost four of their last six games to end the season so were looking for "something good to happen". Longhorns hit 63% of their field-goal attempts in the first half and pulled down rebounds when they missed, which help them open up a 28–4 lead by the end of the first quarter. They cruised to a 78–50 victory to end the Sugar Bears 17 game winning streak. Every one of the 11 players for Texas played at least 11 minutes and scored.
 Kansas State played Drake in a match-up between the 7 and 10 seeds. Normally, the game would have been played at the location of the top seed in the group, Stanford, but they had a conflict due to a gymnastics event so the hosting fell to the next highest seed. Thus, Kansas State were able to play at home for the first time since 2003. After scoring the first basket, Drake hit two three-pointers to take a 6–2 lead, but the Wildcats went on a 9–0 run to take back the lead. With a little over four minutes left in the game, the Wildcats only had a seven-point lead when Kindred Wesemann hit a three to extend the lead to double digits. Drake was unable to respond, and the Wildcats ended up with the win 67–54.
 Second-ranked Stanford faced New Mexico State in a first-round matchup between a 2 seed and a 15 seed. A 15 seed has never beaten a two seed in the women's NCAA tournament. The Aggie scored first and led early finishing the first quarter with a 23–20 lead. Although the Cardinal tied the game in the second quarter, New Mexico took back the lead and led 38–31 at halftime. The Cardinal started the third quarter with an 8–2 run for Stanford, but when the final quarter began New Mexico was still in the lead 49–48. New Mexico scored first in the fourth quarter with a three-pointer, but Stanford went on a run, took the lead and ended up with the win 72–64.

Bracket 

* – Denotes overtime period

Lexington Regional Final

Lexington Regional All-Tournament team
 Arike Ogunbowale, Notre Dame (MOP)
 Lindsay Allen, Notre Dame
 Marina Mabrey, Notre Dame
 Brittany McPhee, Stanford
 Karlie Samuelson, Stanford

Stockton Regional, Stockton, CA

First round 
 South Carolina took on UNC Asheville in a match-up between the top seed and the 16 seed. Coach Staley had to make adjustments as a result of the season-ending injury to starter Alaina Coates. She started four guards along with A'ja Wilson, and then went even smaller in the second quarter. The Bulldogs were no match for the Gamecocks and South Carolina led 48–22 at halftime and went on to win the game 90–40 representing their biggest victory ever in the tournament.
 Arizona State faced Michigan State in a match-up between the eight and nine seeds. The Sun Devils' Quinn Dornstauder attempted six field goals and four free throws, making every one of them, leading to 16 points. AlthoughMichigan State's Tori Jankoska scored 26 points she was held to two points in the first half and scored most of her points late in the game when Arizona State had a large lead. Arizona State hit 59% of the field-goal attempts in the first half leading to a 22-point margin at the break. They went on to win the game 73–61.
 Quinnipiac opened their game with an 18–4 run against fifth-seeded Marquette. The Bobcats had extended their lead to 19 points, 52–33 in the third quarter when Marquette started to come back. The Golden Eagles cut the lead to two points near the end of the game. Quinnipiac had a three-point lead in the final seconds when Marquette attempted a three-pointer to tie the game but it rimmed out to give the Bobcats their first win ever in an NCAA tournament. Jennifer Fay scored 20 points for the Bobcats. Quinnipiac ended with the win 68–65.
 Fourth-seeded Miami took on 13th-seeded Florida Gulf Coast. Miami led most of the way by as much as 13 points, but the Eagles mounted to come back and took a small lead late in the game. The game was tied with 1.5 seconds left when Keyona Hayes scored to give the hurricanes a two-point lead. Florida Gulf Coast tried to set up final play but was unable to score. Miami won the game 62–60.

Bracket

Stockton Regional Final

Stockton Regional All-Tournament team
 Kaela Davis, South Carolina (MOP)
 Allisha Gray, South Carolina
 A'ja Wilson, South Carolina
 Leticia Romero, Florida State
 Ivey Slaughter, Florida State

Final Four

American Airlines Center – Dallas, TX 

* – Denotes overtime period

National semifinals

National championship

Final Four All-Tournament team
 A'ja Wilson, South Carolina (MOP)
 Allisha Gray, South Carolina
 Morgan William, Mississippi State
 Victoria Vivians, Mississippi State
 Gabby Williams, UConn

Record by conference

The R64, R32, S16, E8, F4, CG, and NC columns indicate how many teams from each conference were in the round of 64 (first round), round of 32 (second round), Sweet 16, Elite Eight, Final Four, championship game, and national champion, respectively.
The America East, Atlantic 10, Atlantic Sun, Big Sky, Big South, Big West, Conference USA, Colonial (CAA), Horizon, Ivy League, MEAC, Mid-American (MAC), Mountain West, Northeast, Ohio Valley, Patriot, Southern, Southland, Summit, Sun Belt, SWAC, WAC and West Coast conferences each had one representative that was eliminated in the first round.

Media coverage

Television
ESPN had US television rights to all games during the tournament. For the first and second round, ESPN aired select games nationally on ESPN2, ESPNU, or ESPNews. All other games aired regionally on ESPN, ESPN2, or ESPN3 and were streamed online via WatchESPN. Most of the nation got whip-a-round coverage during this time, which allowed ESPN to rotate between the games and focus the nation on the game that had the closest score. The Lexington and Oklahoma City regional semifinals aired concurrently on ESPN and ESPN2, while ESPN televised the Bridgeport and Stockton regional semifinals and all four regional finals. The national semifinals aired on ESPN2, and the national championship on ESPN.

Studio host and analysts
Maria Taylor (Host)
Rebecca Lobo (Analyst)
Andy Landers (Analyst)

Broadcast assignments

First & Second Rounds Friday/Sunday
Courtney Lyle & Tamika Catchings – College Park, Maryland
Roy Philpott & Brooke Weisbrod – Austin, Texas
Beth Mowins & Nell Fortner – Lexington, Kentucky
Bob Picozzi & Katie Smith – Starkville, Mississippi
Dave Pasch & LaChina Robinson – Columbia, South Carolina
Paul Sunderland & Mike Thibault – Notre Dame, Indiana
Elise Woodward & Mary Murphy – Corvallis, Oregon
Melissa Lee & Angel Gray – Tallahassee, Florida
Sweet Sixteen & Elite Eight Friday/Sunday
Pam Ward, Gail Goestenkors, & Kaylee Hartung – Oklahoma City, Oklahoma
Beth Mowins, Debbie Antonelli, & Allison Williams – Lexington, Kentucky
Final Four
Dave O'Brien, Doris Burke, Kara Lawson, & Holly Rowe – Dallas, Texas

First & Second Rounds Saturday/Monday
Eric Frede & Dan Hughes – Storrs, Connecticut
Dave O'Brien, Doris Burke, & Kara Lawson – Louisville, Kentucky
Brenda VanLengen & Carol Ross – Manhattan, Kansas
Jenn Hildreth & Steffi Sorensen – Coral Gables, Florida
Lowell Galindo & Sue Bird – Waco, Texas
Pam Ward & Gail Goestenkors – Seattle, Washington
Sam Gore & Julianne Viani – Los Angeles, California
Clay Matvick & Christy Winters-Scott – Durham, North Carolina
Sweet Sixteen & Elite Eight Saturday/Monday
Dave O'Brien, Doris Burke, Kara Lawson, & Holly Rowe – Bridgeport, Connecticut
Dave Pasch, LaChina Robinson, & Molly McGrath – Stockton, California
Championship
Dave O'Brien, Doris Burke, Kara Lawson, & Holly Rowe – Dallas, Texas

Radio
Westwood One has exclusive radio rights to the entire tournament. Teams participating in the Regional Finals, Final Four, and championship are allowed to have their own local broadcasts, but they aren't allowed to stream those broadcasts online.

Regional Finals Sunday
 Mark Hauser & Kristen Kozlowski – Lexington, Kentucky
 Ted Emrich & Julianne Viani – Oklahoma City, Oklahoma
Final Four
 John Sadak, Debbie Antonelli, & Krista Blunk – Dallas, Texas

Regional Finals Monday
 John Sadak & Debbie Antonelli – Bridgeport, Connecticut
 Dick Fain & Krista Blunk – Stockton, California
Championship
 John Sadak, Debbie Antonelli, & Krista Blunk – Dallas, Texas

See also

 2017 NCAA Division I men's basketball tournament

References

External links
NCAA Women's Basketball Division I

NCAA tournament
NCAA Division I women's basketball tournament
NCAA Division I women's basketball tournament
NCAA Division I women's basketball tournament
Basketball in the Dallas–Fort Worth metroplex